The Applicators are an American pop punk band. Their music is influenced by classic punk bands such as The Misfits and The Cramps, as well as Motörhead. They formed in January 1999 in Austin, Texas with an all-female lineup: lead vocalist Sabrina, Erica on guitar, Rachel on bass and Katy on drums. The Applicators have toured nationally with Circle Jerks, Buzzcocks, Horrorpops,  The Vibrators, One Man Army, Epoxies, as well as Teen Idols, Fear, and Bad Religion. Bad Religion guitarist Greg Hetson produced their debut album after seeing one of their gigs in Texas while on tour.

Discography

Albums
 What's Your Excuse (Cornerstone R.A.S.) (2001)
 I Know The Truth (The Applicators) (2005)
 My Weapon (King FING'r) (2006)
 Scandal (2015)

Singles and EPs
 17 Again 7" EP (Purocrema) (2002)
 Applicators EP (B-Unique/7176) (2004)

Compilation appearances
 AMP Records Has A Hard-On For Tromquille.com 3XCD (AMP, 2001) - "P.C. Kids"
 2002 Sampler: I Have Potential (Cornerstone R.A.S., 2002) - "I Want To Live", "I Don't Bleed"
 KVRX Local Live 7: "Better Than Friends" (KVRX, 2003) - "U Got It All"
 The Greater Southbridge Soundtrack (Tight Spot, 2004) - "Action Anthem"
 Look At All The Love We Found: A Tribute To Sublime (Cornerstone R.A.S., 2005) - "New Realization"
 Vans Off The Wall Vol. VIII (Vans, 2005) - "My Weapon"
 Loud Fast Rules: Volume #5 (Loud Fast Rules, 2006) - "Shove U Out"
 Voices In The Wilderness (DIY and Proud) - "I Don't Bleed"

References

External links
 Official The Applicators website
 [ Allmusic.com entry]
 Artistdirect.com entry
 VH1.com The Applicators

All-female punk bands
Punk rock groups from Texas
Musical groups from Austin, Texas
Musical quartets
Musical groups established in 1999
1999 establishments in Texas
History of women in Texas